Nergaard is a Norwegian surname. In 2018, there were 478 people with this surname in Norway and 15 in Denmark.

People
Notable people with the surname include:
Anita Nergaard (born 1967), Norwegian diplomat
Ivar Nergaard (born 1964), Norwegian actor
Leiv Nergaard (born 1940),  Norwegian businessperson
Liv Nergaard (1924–2016), Norwegian sculptor and painter
Magnus Skavhaug Nergaard (born 1989), Norwegian jazz musician
Rune Nergaard (born 1989), Norwegian jazz musician
Sigurd Nergaard (1873–1932),  Norwegian folklorist
Silje Nergaard (born 1966), Norwegian singer
Torger Nergård (also spelled Nergaard; born 1974), Norwegian curler
Fredrik Havig (a.k.a. Christian Fredrik Nergaard Havig; 1855–1927), Norwegian judge, mayor, and Storting representative

Other
Nergaard Peak, a peak in Queen Maud Land, Antarctica

See also
 Nergård, a variant spelling of Nergaard.

References

Norwegian-language surnames